AAX may refer to:

AAX (Atom Asset Exchange)
AirAsia X
Araxá Airport, Brazil
 Audible Enhanced Audio format for audiobooks
 The Enochian angel
 Mandobo language, a Papuan language of Indonesia
 AAX (Avid Audio eXtension), a plugin format for Pro Tools software

See also
 AAXICO
 AA (disambiguation)
 AX (disambiguation)